Riegelsberg is a municipality in the District of Saarbrücken, Saarland, Germany. It is situated approximately 9 km northwest of Saarbrücken.

References

Saarbrücken (district)